Fiona Kennedy Clark, OBE, DL is a Scottish singer, actress, and broadcaster, and the daughter of Scottish and Gaelic singers Calum Kennedy and Anne Gillies. As a child, she appeared with her parents as they performed as a family, and this developed into a successful solo career.

Career 
Kennedy's TV appearances include the 1971 series The Witch's Daughter, Sutherland's Law and Mauro the Gypsy, made for The Childrens Film Foundation and released in 1972, four series of Record Breakers on BBC1 and the New Year Show with Sir Trevor MacDonald. She also presented Behind the Scenes at Monarch of the Glen. She has also appeared on BBC TV's Songs of Praise as a singer.

She had a role in the 1973 film The Wicker Man, in which she played Holly.
Her production ‘The Kist’ has enjoyed 5 star reviews at The Edinburgh Fringe Festival and has also been performed in Aberdeen, Glasgow and New York! 

She has recorded several albums including Maiden Heaven and Coming Home. Her 2017 album Time to Fly includes songs co-written with Beth Nielsen-Chapman and duets with Ross Wilson of Blue Rose Code.

Kennedy has sung for the Queen on a number of occasions, and performing at the G8 Summit at Edinburgh Castle. She has sung at the first NATO Burns Supper in Brussels, performed at Celtic Connections and Transatlantic Sessions on BBC 2, touring with Runrig, hosted television programmes for PBS in America, narrated ‘Peter and the Wolf’ and ‘The Snowman’ with the RSNO, presented ‘Live at The Lemon Tree’ for BBC Scotland with Phil Cunningham, and narrated ‘The Three Ships’ with Sir Tony Robinson, composed by Paul Mealor. She has acted in a number of plays including ‘Alfie’ in the West End and ‘Ane Satire of the Thrie Estaires’ at The Edinburgh Festival.

A visit to Ellis Island inspired her own production The Kist, which appeared at the Edinburgh Fringe Festival, as well as at venues in Scotland, London and New York. She collaborates regularly with writer and director John Bett including 10 years of Nae Ordinary Burns Supper.

Kennedy is a Deputy Lord Lieutenant of Aberdeenshire. She is Honorary President of Voluntary Service Aberdeen, and is the Patron of charities including FROM Scotland (Famine Relief for Orphans in Malawi), Speakeasy, St Margaret’s Braemar, Jazzartuk and  Pitlochry Festival Theatre. In addition, she is a Trustee of the University of Aberdeen's Development Trust and an Ambassador for London Scottish Rugby Club.

Honours 
Kennedy was appointed Officer of the Order of the British Empire (OBE) in the 2014 New Year Honours for services to music and for charitable services in Scotland.

References

External links
 
 Fiona Kennedy Scottish Singer at aboutaberdeen.com
Video footage of Fiona Kennedy and Karen Matheson

Living people
Scottish Gaelic singers
Year of birth missing (living people)
Place of birth missing (living people)
Officers of the Order of the British Empire
Deputy Lieutenants of Aberdeenshire
20th-century Scottish women singers
Scottish film actresses
Scottish television actresses
Scottish child actresses
Scottish broadcasters
Scottish television personalities
Scottish television presenters
Scottish women television presenters
Scottish radio personalities
Scottish radio presenters
People from Aberdeen
Scottish child singers
People educated at Westbourne School for Girls
Scottish women radio presenters